Chloroclystis embolocosma is a species of moth in the family Geometridae. It is found in Australia (Queensland).

References

Moths described in 1936
Chloroclystis
Moths of Australia